is a Japanese film director and screenwriter.

Career 

Born in Tokyo, Fukada had a father who was a film aficionado and he watched many films on VHS when he was young. It was when he was 19 years old studying at Taisho University and discovered the Film School of Tokyo that he began taking evening classes in filmmaking. One of his teachers was Kiyoshi Kurosawa. He made his first feature-length film, The Chair, in 2002. He joined the Seinendan theater troupe, headed by Oriza Hirata, in 2005, and has often used their work and their actors in his films.

Influences 

Fukada has said that he was strongly influenced by the films of Eric Rohmer, particularly The Green Ray, and was inspired to become a filmmaker after seeing Children of Paradise and The Spirit of the Beehive.

Awards 

His film Hospitalité won the Best Picture Award in the Japanese Eyes competition of the Tokyo International Film Festival in 2010. Au revoir l'été won the grand prize and the prize of the young jury at the Three Continents Festival in 2013. And his 2016 film Harmonium won the Prix du Jury in the Un Certain Regard section of the Cannes Film Festival.

Filmography

 The Chair (2002)
 Hospitalité (2010)
 Au revoir l'été (2013)
 Sayonara (2015)
 Harmonium (2016)
 The Man from the Sea (2018)
 A Girl Missing (2019)
 The Real Thing (2020, compilation film of 2019 TV series)
 Love Life (2022)

References

External links 

 

Japanese film directors
Japanese screenwriters
1980 births
Living people
People from Koganei, Tokyo